Arbutus Lake is a lake in Grand Traverse County, Michigan.YMCA Camp Hayo-Went-Ha is located on the northeastern shore of the lake, and some of its common activities, such as rowing, fishing, and others on the lake.

The lake is composed of five smaller lakes, numbered Lakes 1, 2, 3, 4, and 5, ordered from south to north. Arbutus Lake, as well as the other Forest Lakes, is a part of the Boardman River watershed.

References

Lakes of Grand Traverse County, Michigan